During the 2006–07 season, West Bromwich Albion competed in the Football League Championship, having been relegated from the FA Premier League the previous season.

Season summary
West Brom began the season slowly and manager Bryan Robson departed as manager in October by mutual consent. Under his successor, Tony Mowbray, West Brom were a permanent fixture in the top six from late December onwards and led the division briefly in February, but a run of four defeats in five games at home saw them fall out of contention for automatic promotion. They secured their play-off place with a 7–0 home win against Barnsley on the final day of the league season, finishing fourth in the process. This was one place above Wolverhampton Wanderers, by virtue of a superior goal difference, but eight points behind Derby County. West Brom scored 81 league goals during the campaign, the highest tally of any team in the Football League in 2006–07.

In the play-off semi-finals, Albion faced local rivals and fifth-placed team Wolverhampton Wanderers, winning the first leg 3–2 and the second 1–0 to progress 4–2 on aggregate. The second leg was the fifth meeting between the two sides during 2006–07, setting a new record for the most times that the Black Country derby has been contested in a single campaign, while West Brom's four wins against their rivals was also a season record for matches between the two.

In the play-off final game, West Brom were defeated by Derby, with Stephen Pearson scoring the only goal of the game.

Kit
English company Umbro became West Brom's kit manufacturers for the season. T-Mobile remained the kit sponsors.

Final league table

Results
West Bromwich Albion's score comes first

Legend

Football League Championship

Championship play-offs

FA Cup

League Cup

Players

First-team squad
Squad at end of season

Left club during season

Notes

References

West Bromwich Albion F.C. seasons
West Bromwich Albion